Aleksandr Vladimirovich Kuzmichyov (born 23 April 1971) is a former Russian professional footballer who played as either a midfielder or striker.

Honours

Team
Soviet Cup: Runner-up 1991

Individual
Russian Second Division (West Zone): Top scorer 1997 (33 goals)

External links

1971 births
Footballers from Moscow
Living people
Soviet footballers
Russian footballers
Association football midfielders
Association football forwards
FC Torpedo Moscow players
FC Torpedo-2 players
FC Lokomotiv Moscow players
C.D. Feirense players
FC Lokomotiv Nizhny Novgorod players
FC Arsenal Tula players
FC Rubin Kazan players
FC KAMAZ Naberezhnye Chelny players
FC Vityaz Podolsk players
Soviet Top League players
Russian Premier League players
Liga Portugal 2 players
Russian expatriate footballers
Expatriate footballers in Portugal
Russian expatriate sportspeople in Portugal
Russian football managers
FC Sheksna Cherepovets players